Financial technology (also called FinTech) is an industry composed of companies that use technology to offer financial services. These companies operate in insurance, asset management and payment, and numerous other industries. FinTech has emerged as a relatively new industry in India in past few years. The Indian market has witnessed massive investments in various sectors adopting FinTech, which has been driven partly by the robust and effective government reforms that are pushing the country towards a digital economy. It has also been aided by the growing internet and smartphone penetration, leading to the adoption of digital technologies and rise of FinTech in the country

According to a report by Ernst & Young (EY), India is one of the largest and fastest growing FinTech ecosystems of the world. It stands second after China in terms of FinTech adoption index with an adoption rate of 87%. The overall estimation of the FinTech market in 2021 for India has come out to be $31 billion as mentioned in a report by BLinC Invest.

Rise of FinTech in India 
The number of startups in India have grown significantly over the past few years. The number of newly founded startups has increased from 733 in 2016-17 to over 14000 in 2021-22, making India the third largest startup ecosystem in the world after the US and China. Among them, around 6600 startups have been in the FinTech industry evaluating to a market value of US $31 billion in 2021. This rapid growth in the number of startups has been a result of a large talent pool, conducive regulations, and an increased venture capital flow in the past decade. An increased smartphone and internet penetration coupled with a demand for tailored services and superior customer experience by the public, has helped as well.

Financial Technologies have received substantial funding from venture capital and private equity firms. A total of US $8 billion has been invested in FinTechs across around 1000 deals according to a Tracxn database obtained by Deloitte over a period starting 2015 to mid-2020. With another US $8 billion investment in 2021 alone, there has been an exponential rise in the funding. Majority of these deals have been in the digital payment sector and recently in alternative lending and InsurTech as well. Top investments include a PE investment of US $600 million in Pine Labs, and large VC funding rounds by BharatPe (US $395 million), Razorpay (US $375 million), and OfBusiness (US $325 million).

Key Drivers 
Increased funding: A substantial increase in investments from venture capital, private equity and institutional investment has encouraged the rise of FinTech startups.

India Stack: India Stack is a set of APIs that allows governments, businesses, startups, and developers to utilize a unique and common digital Infrastructure. These open API platforms include Aadhar, Unified Payments Interface (UPI), Bharat Bill payments, etc.

Innovation in Technology: New business models are being developed using technologies like Machine learning and Artificial Intelligence.

Increase in smartphone and internet users: India has the 2nd highest number of smartphone users globally with numbers around 550-600 million, and 2nd largest Internet user market with over 795 million internet users as of December 2020.

Government initiatives and Regulators: Government initiatives like Jan Dhan Yojana, Startup India, Digital India program, etc. have played a vital role in encouraging the growth of startups. Startup India, for example, has enabled an online platform-based solution for entrepreneurs to safeguard their intellectual property (IP) and it has offered the startups some exemptions from taxes under certain eligibility criteria. The regulations developed by the Reserve Bank of India (RBI), IRDAI and SEBI has ensured increased accountability and the uninterrupted availability of secure and affordable digital financial systems.

International Collaboration: Startup India has enabled collaboration between Indian startup ecosystem and the global startup ecosystem by enabling bridges that provide a soft landing to emerging new startups from the partnering countries. It has helped promoted enthusiasm by fostering knowledge exchange and fund support mechanisms.

Startups and Unicorns 
According to the Economic Survey published by Invest India, National Investment Promotion and Facilitation Agency, 44 Indian startups achieved the 'Unicorn' status in the year 2021 alone, increasing the total number of Indian unicorns to 83, with a total evaluation of over US $277 billion. Out of 83, 15 unicorns belong to the FinTech industry with a current valuation of around US $60 billion.

FinTech Sectors

Digital Payments 
In recent years, there has been an extensive adoption and significant growth in the digital payments sector with a compound annual growth rate (CAGR) of around 60% from FY2016 to FY2020 and 37% from FY2019 to FY2021.

The use of digital payments increased significantly in the past few years, with the key reasons being the demonetization initiative announced by Indian Government in 2016 and the outbreak of COVID-19 in 2020. Due to demonetization, the number of cash transactions decreased as the old currency was replaced by new ones to put an end to illegal transactions and tax evasion. This made people resort to using digital payment methods. Similar effects were seen with the onset of the COVID-19 pandemic when people started preferring contactless payment methods to curb the spread of infection. Figure 1 shows that there is an exponential rise in the value of transactions made using UPI. Figure 2 shows the yearly trend in the number of UPI transactions. This increase in the use of UPI can be attributed to the ease with which UPI can be plugged in any consumer tech platform and help it add payment as a useful consumer-centric feature.

In India, digital payment FinTechs have received the highest amount of funding among all the FinTech sectors as per a report by EY. According a Tracxn database obtained by Deloitte and EY, over 500 FinTech startups were founded in this sector between 2014-19. Digital payments FinTechs obtained an investment of about US $1 billion in just first five months of 2021 as opposed to just US $1.4 billion during the whole of 2020.

Due to a substantial increase in investments in 2021, 3 new unicorns were added to the Digital payment sector by first quarter of 2022, taking the total to 8 unicorns valuating to a total of US $243 billion and these unicorns include: Paytm, RazorPay, PhonePe, Pine Labs, CRED, BharatPe, BillDesk, Zeta.

Alternative Lending 
The aim of the FinTechs in the alternative lending sector is to deal with the large demand-supply gap of credit in the country. They address the gap by focusing on improving customer experience and gain operating efficiencies, by implementing both conventional and alternative credit scoring models, and digital workflows.

According to Tracxn database obtained by EY, alternative lending as the second biggest receiver of investment in FinTech after Payments sector, at 29% of the total share. India’s retail digital lending space has grown significantly in the past decade (2012-22) from US $9 billion to US $270 billion with a CAGR of 39.5%. This huge rise in the lending space can be attributed to various factors.

Low credit card penetration: As per the data from RBI, the number of credit card holders was 62 million in 2021. Though it has increased at a CAGR of 20% in last 4 years, the actual number is low keeping in mind India’s credit card eligible population.

Unbanked population percentage: According to the World Bank’s Global Findex Report 2017, 80% of Indian adults (age 15+) have a bank account. This shows that round 190 million Indians above the age of 15 don’t have a banking account and thus no access to credit or any kind of loan.

High credit gap: India’s consumer financing gap stands at $300 billion while the financing gap for the Micro, Small and Medium Enterprises (MSME) stands at $240 billion.

Around 450 FinTech startups were founded in this sector during the period 2014-19 with a total funding of US $1.7 billion. The unicorns in this sector include Slice and Oxyzo Financial Services. There are many more alternative platform, like Anq Finance, emerging in this space to solve for high credit gap by innovating and widening the scope

The key business models that have worked for alternative lending FinTechs include payday lending, EMI/Point of Sale (PoS), MSME lending, Buy Now Pay Later (BNPL) loans and Peer-to-peer (P2P) lending.

BNPL 
Buy now pay later (BNPL) is a short-term financing solution that allows customers to make a purchase and pay for it at a future date, usually interest-free. The key value proposition for BNPL is trouble-free credit during checkout. Similar to any lending product, the primary revenue source for BNPL is the income through interests and the fees incurred when customers don’t pay back on time. While the BNPL products prefer to avoid the words ‘loan’ or ‘credit’, it is an IOU (acronym for I owe you) in different form.

Until 2019, monthly 22 million Indian consumers were looking for credit and a 70% of them dropped their applications mid-way due to various intricacies in the traditional process. This is where the key features of BNPL products such as transparency with costs and benefits, and frictionless payment made a significant difference and helped mitigate the effects of high consumer credit demand and low credit card penetration.

Some examples of BNPL include food aggregators (Swiggy and Fassos) which use platforms developed by startups like Simple and Lazypay which allow the customer to pay for their food deliveries at a later stage. Cab aggregators (Uber, Olacabs) and e-commerce platforms (Flipkart, Amazon) have also started providing “pay later” options to their customers.

P2P 
P2P lending is a monetary arrangement between two individuals without the intervention of any mediator, thus removing the expenses made to the financial institutions. Lenders who want to make higher returns from their surplus funds lend to borrowers seeking low-cost and quick unsecured loans. The loans can include personal, business or educational loans. Fintech Firms such as Faircent offer the necessary P2P lending infrastructure to such lenders and borrowers.

P2P FinTechs include Faircent, Lendbox, RupeeCircle, i2iFunding, Paisa Dukan, etc.

MSME 
MSMEs are important to India’s economy as they contribute over 29% to the country’s GDP with a share of 49.4% and 49.8% in the total exports in 2021 and 2020 respectively. According to MSME Pulse report by Small Industries Development Bank of India (SIDBI) made in collaboration with TransUnion CIBIL, MSMEs hold a total credit exposure of INR 17.75 trillion which is about one fourth of the total commercial lending exposure for India totaling to INR 64.45 trillion as of Jan 2020. 

Some of the key FinTechs in this space include LendingKart, psbloansin59minutes.com Flexiloans, KredX and C2FO.

InsurTech 
The life insurance penetration in India was tracked at 3.2% in FY21, while the non-life insurance penetration was at 1.0%, totaling to 4.2% overall penetration. Insurance penetration is calculated as a percentage of insurance premium to GDP. However, the insurance market in India has tremendous potential to grow due to its population majorly in the middle-class income category, and favorable regulatory policies. India’s total real premium growth was 6.9% which was more than twice the world average of 2.9%.

In recent years, the Indian insurance sector has begun aiming at implementing new technologies for an efficient insurance distribution. These technologies include but are not limited to wearables, IoT-linked products, etc. The market is experiencing a sudden increase in demand for small premium bite-size insurance, microinsurance, remote claims management capabilities, and chat bots for enhanced customer service. This has given rise to new opportunities for InsureTech segment in India.

According to Tracxn database obtained by EY, there are more than 300 InsurTech companies which include Acko, easypolicy, turtlemint, Policyboss.com, etc.  The sector has generated two unicorns as well: PolicyBazaar and Digit Insurance.

Further reading 

 Fintech in India - can the trust stack up? By Beni Chugh, Dvara Research
 RBI must accommodate fintech innovations, not ban them
 Making digital finance work for women

References

Mobile payments in India
Online banking
Insurance in India
Technology in society